Lolita Cuevas (1910–1994) was a Puerto Rican-born singer and actress. Her work as a vocalist was based on a compendium of Caribbean songs, and her interpretations of them are considered a fundamental piece in the historiography of Haitian music.

Biography 
Lolita Cuevas was born in Mayagüez, Puerto Rico in 1910. Her family moved to Haiti when she was two, where she then spent her childhood.

At the age of fifteen she gave her first concert as a professional singer in Port-au-Prince. From there her career took off, and she frequently sang for the radio and concerts around the Caribbean, Latin America, and the United States.

In 1941 her interpretation of La Borinqueña became popular in Puerto Rico, and she recorded versions of "In My Old San Juan" in French and Creole.

In 1953 she recorded the album "Haitian Folk Songs" with guitarist and arranger Frantz Casseus.

She died in 1994.

External links 
"Mujeres pioneras puertorriqueñas" Consultado el 6 de abril de 2010
 notas contenidas en el álbum "Haitian folk songs" del Smithsonian Institution Consultado el 6 de abril de 2010

1910 births
1994 deaths
People from Mayagüez, Puerto Rico
Puerto Rican emigrants
Spanish-language singers
20th-century Haitian women singers
Haitian people of Puerto Rican descent